The High Commissioner of the United Kingdom to Lesotho is the United Kingdom's diplomatic representative to the Kingdom of Lesotho.

History
In 2005 the British Government closed its High Commission in Maseru, and from then until 2019 British interests in Lesotho were represented by the British High Commissioner to South Africa. The High Commission in Maseru reopened in May 2019 with a resident High Commissioner.

List of heads of mission

High Commissioners to Lesotho

1966–1970: Ian Watt
1970–1973: Harry Bass
1973–1976: Martin Moynihan
1976–1978: Reginald Hobden
1978–1981: Owen Griffith
1981–1984: Clive Clemens
1984–1988: Peter Rosling
1988–1991: John Edwards
1992–1996: Roy Cowling
1996–1999: Peter Smith
1999–2002: Kaye Oliver
2002–2005: Frank Martin
2005–2009: Paul Boateng (non-resident)
2009–2013: Dame Nicola Brewer (non-resident)
2013–2017: Dame Judith Macgregor (non-resident)
2017–2019: Nigel Casey (non-resident)
2019–2022: Anne Macro

2022–: Harry MacDonald

References

Lesotho
United Kingdom
 
Lesotho and the Commonwealth of Nations
United Kingdom and the Commonwealth of Nations